The Ethiopian records in swimming are the fastest ever performances of swimmers from Ethiopia, which are recognised and ratified by the Ethiopian Swimming Federation.

All records were set in finals unless noted otherwise.

Long Course (50 m)

Men

Women

Short Course (25 m)

Men

Women

References

Ethiopia
Records
swimming
Swimming